An autocollimator is an optical instrument for non-contact measurement of angles. They are typically used to align components and measure deflections in optical or mechanical systems. An autocollimator works by projecting an image onto a target mirror and measuring the deflection of the returned image against a scale, either visually or by means of an electronic detector. A visual autocollimator can measure angles as small as 1 arcsecond (4.85 microradians), while an electronic autocollimator can have up to 100 times more resolution.

Visual autocollimators are often used for aligning laser rod ends and checking the face parallelism of optical windows and wedges. Electronic and digital autocollimators are used as angle measurement standards, for monitoring angular movement over long periods of time and for checking angular position repeatability in mechanical systems.  Servo autocollimators are specialized compact forms of electronic autocollimators that are used in high-speed servo-feedback loops for stable-platform applications. An electronic autocollimator is typically calibrated to read the actual mirror angle.

Electronic autocollimator
The electronic autocollimator is a high precision angle measurement instrument capable of measuring angular deviations with accuracy down to fractions of an arcsecond, by electronic means only, with no optical eye-piece. 

  
Measuring with an electronic autocollimator is fast, easy, accurate, and will frequently be the most cost effective procedure. Used extensively in workshops, tool rooms, inspection departments and quality control laboratories worldwide, these highly sensitive instruments will measure extremely small angular displacements, squareness, twist and parallelism.

Laser analyzing autocollimator 
Today, a new technology allows to improve the autocollimation instrument to allow direct measurements of incoming laser beams. This new capability opens a gate of inter-alignment between optics, mirrors and lasers.
This technology fusion between a century-old technology of autocollimation with recent laser technology offers a very versatile instrument capable of measurement of inter-alignment between multiple line of sights, laser in respect to mechanical datum, alignment of laser cavity, measurement of multiple rollers parallelism in roll to roll machinery, laser divergence angle and its spatial stability and many more inter-alignment applications.

Total station autocollimator 
The concept of autocollimation as an optical instrument was conceived about a century ago for non-contact measurements of angles. Hybrid technology fulfills a need recently developed by novel photonics applications has created for the alignment and measurement of optics and lasers. Implementing motorized focusing offers an additional measurement dimension by focusing on the area to be examined and performing alignment and deviations from alignment on the scale of microns. This is relevant in the adjustment phase as well as final testing and examination phases of integrated systems. Recent progress has been made in with the aim to serve the photonics AR/VR industry, involving development in interalingment, fusion of several wavelengths including NIR into one system, and measurements of multi laser array such as VCSEL in respect with other optical sensors, to improve angular accurate optical measurements to a resolution of 0.01 arcseconds.

Typical applications 
An electronic autocollimator can be used in the measurement of straightness of machine components (such as guide ways) or the straightness of lines of motion of machine components. Flatness measurement, of granite surface plates, for example, can be performed by measuring straightness of multiple lines along the flat surface, then summing the deviations in line angle over the surface.  Recent advancements in applications allow angular orientation measurement of wafers. This could also be done without obstructing lines of sight to the wafer's surface itself. It is applicable in wafer measuring machines and wafer processing machines. Other applications include:

 Aircraft assembly jigs
 Satellite testing
 Steam and gas turbines
 Marine propulsion machinery
 Printing presses
 Air compressors
 Cranes
 Diesel engines
 Nuclear reactors
 Coal conveyors
 Shipbuilding and repair
 Rolling mills 
 Rod and wire mills
 Extruder barrels

Optical measurement applications:

 Retro reflector measurement
 Roof prism measurement
 Optical assembly procedures
 Alignment of beam delivery systems
 Alignment of laser cavity
 Testing perpendicularity of laser rods in respect to its axis
 Real time measurement of angular stability of mirror elements.

See also
 Autocollimation
 Collimator

References

Optical instruments
Optical metrology
Measuring instruments